Krasnoarmeysk may refer to:

Krasnoarmeysk, Moscow Oblast, a town in Russia, and its surrounding municipal division (urban okrug)
Krasnoarmeysk, Saratov Oblast, a town in Russia, and its surrounding municipal division (urban okrug)
Pokrovsk, Ukraine, formerly Krasnoarmiisk (Krasnoarmeysk), a town in Ukraine
Taiynsha, Kazakhstan, formerly Krasnoarmeysk

See also
Krasnoarmeysky (disambiguation)